Mnichowo  is a village in the administrative district of Gmina Gniezno, within Gniezno County, Greater Poland Voivodeship, in west-central Poland.

The village has an approximate population of 450.

References

Mnichowo